Bistrets may refer to the following places in Bulgaria:

 Bistrets, Burgas Province
 Bistrets, Dobrich Province